Andy Stokes (born June 2, 1981) is a former American football tight end. He was drafted with the final pick in the 2005 NFL Draft, earning him the title of Mr. Irrelevant. Stokes played college football for William Penn University.

High School Years
Stokes attended Moapa Valley High School in Nevada where he was an All State football player as well as playing baseball, and basketball. He graduated in 1999. He then attended William Penn to play football.

College career
Andy Stokes caught 32 passes for 417 yards (13.0 avg.) and a pair of touchdowns as a sophomore. The following year, he caught 30 passes for 408 yards (13.6 avg.) and three scores, adding 23 yards on three rushing attempts (7.7 avg.) and also posted five tackles (4 solos) on special teams. For that performance, he was named All-Mid-States Football Association honorable mention.

In 2004, Stokes was awarded third-team NAIA All-America and first-team All-MSFA honors. He was also named to Football Gazette's all-region team. He finished second on the team with a career-high 42 receptions for 753 yards (17.9 avg.) and five touchdowns. He ran once for 16 yards, threw an option pass for 39 yards and recorded four tackles. In 31 games with the Statesmen, Stokes snatched 104 passes for 1,578 yards (15.2 avg.) and 10 touchdowns. He rushed four times for 39 yards (9.8 avg.) and had a 39-yard pass completion. He also recorded nine tackles (6 solos).

Professional career
Stokes was drafted by the New England Patriots in the 2005 NFL Draft as the 255 overall pick earning the title Mr. Irrelevant an award that goes to the last player picked in the NFL Draft.  Despite college success, Stokes failed to make an NFL roster.  He played during the offseason with the New England Patriots, Arizona Cardinals, and the Seattle Seahawks.

External links
Just Sports Stats

1981 births
Living people
American football tight ends
Arizona Cardinals players
New England Patriots players
Rhein Fire players
Seattle Seahawks players
William Penn Statesmen football players